Tahifehifa is an island in Tonga. It is located within the Vava'u Group in the far north of the country, 15 kilometers (9 miles) south of the town of Neiafu. This small island of about two and a half acres in size, (one hectare), is owned by the Tongan company 'Pacific Oasis Ltd' on a 99-year Deed of Lease.

External links

References 

Islands of Tonga
Vavaʻu